Palujüri is a village in Rõuge Parish, Võru County in Estonia. In the central part of the village is Lake Palujüri, which is connected by a stream to Lake Hanija within the boundaries of the neighboring village.

References

Villages in Võru County